Ove Claes Johansson (born March 31, 1948) is a former American football placekicker and the current holder of the record for the longest field goal ever kicked during an American football game, at , for Abilene Christian University in their October 16, 1976 victory over East Texas State. Johansson is the oldest player to be drafted in the NFL Draft, being 28 years, 281 days old when he was selected in the 12th round of the 1977 NFL Draft by the Houston Oilers.

Johansson was a junior at Abilene Christian University after being an all American soccer player at national power Davis and Elkins College, and performed this kick during ACU's 1976 homecoming game against East Texas State University at Shotwell Stadium, in Abilene, Texas.  This record kick is longer than any other field goal kicked in organized football, one yard longer than the current high school record set by Dirk Borgognone in 1985, two yards longer than the NCAA record (Abilene Christian was playing in the National Association of Intercollegiate Athletics at the time), and three yards longer than the current NFL record of 66 yards set by Justin Tucker in the Baltimore Ravens vs. Detroit Lions game of September 26, 2021.

Professional career
Johansson had previously played association football, and the 1976 season was his first and only season to play college football.  He hurt his knee in a season-ending bowl game and played in just two regular season games in the National Football League.  Kicking for the Philadelphia Eagles in 1977, he was successful in only one of his four field goal attempts and one of three extra points. Johansson was the first Swedish-born player to play in the NFL, twelve years before Björn Nittmo.

He is currently a businessman in Amarillo, Texas.  He is married to April (Bankes) Johansson, and they have a daughter, Annika Johansson, and a son, Stefan Johansson.  The family is bilingual English-Swedish.

References

External links
Video of record breaking kick

1948 births
Living people
Abilene Christian Wildcats football players
American football placekickers
American management consultants
American members of the Churches of Christ
Businesspeople from Texas
Davis & Elkins Senators men's soccer players
Sportspeople from Abilene, Texas
Sportspeople from Amarillo, Texas
Sportspeople from Gothenburg
Philadelphia Eagles players
Swedish emigrants to the United States
Swedish players of American football
Texas Republicans
Association footballers not categorized by position
Association football players not categorized by nationality